Nooter Eriksen, also known as Nooter/Eriksen or N/E, is a supplier of heat recovery steam generators (boiler technology), which are mostly found in combined cycle gas turbine power stations (CCGTs). These are also found in combined heat and power (CHP) systems, which tend to have a much smaller power output than CCGT stations. Nooter Eriksen is a subsidiary of CIC Group, also owning Nooter Construction, the Wyatt Group.

History
Nooter Corporation was established in 1896. Nooter/Eriksen Cogeneration Systems was established in 1987 when Eriksen Engineering (headed by Vernon Eriksen) was taken over by the Nooter Corporation. Vernon Eriksen had joined Econotherm Corporation in 1985, which became Eriksen Engineering.

In the 1990s the market for heat-recovery steam generators for combined cycle gas turbines started. The company reached its peak for orders (c. 18,000 MW of plant) in 2001. Nooter/Eriksen is a subsidiary of employee-owned holding company CIC, which has investments in several different industrial and manufacturing businesses.

Structure

International sites
 Nooter/Eriksen S.r.l., Cardano al Campo, a site of the Marcegaglia Group, founded in 2005

Products
It makes heat recovery steam generators (HRSGs) for gas turbine units of over 8MW in power. Most of its units are for the 125-200MW power range. It has made over 800 HRSGs for use in CCGTs around the world. Around 380 of these HRSGs include supplementary firing. The HRSG can boost the thermal efficiency from around 30-40% to over 60%.

In the USA in 2004 it had 57% of the market for HRSGs. Alstom and Vogt Power International had 14% each, Deltak had 7% and IST had 5%.

Technologies
 Selective catalytic reduction (SCR, anhydrous ammonia and aqueous ammonia)

Headquarters 
Nooter/Eriksen completely occupies a 90,000 square foot office building in Fenton, Missouri- a suburb of Saint Louis

See also
 List of boiler types, by manufacturer

References

Air pollution control systems
Cogeneration
Combustion engineering
Companies based in Lombardy
Companies based in St. Louis County, Missouri
Engineering companies of the United States
Manufacturing companies based in Missouri